Green Island, also known as North Brewster Island, is a rocky outer island in the Boston Harbor Islands National Recreation Area, to the north of Calf Island and Hypocrite Channel. The island is named after Joseph Green, a well-known merchant, who owned the island during Colonial times.

Green Island is a nesting area for herring gulls, black-backed gulls, cormorants, barn swallows, red-winged blackbirds, and rats. The island is a popular location for striped bass fishermen during the summer months. However, access by humans is difficult, and especially discouraged during the birds' nesting season.

History

Due to the severity of the cold weather during the winter of 1865, Samuel Choat had to be removed from Green Island. He was 70 years of age at the time. On February 8, Choat was transferred to the State Almshouse in Bridgewater where he died on February 23, 1865.

See also

Great Brewster
Little Brewster
Middle Brewster
Outer Brewster
Long Island
Tewksbury Rock (Massachusetts)

References

Boston Harbor islands
Islands of Suffolk County, Massachusetts